The 2011–12 season was St Johnstone's third consecutive season in the Scottish Premier League, having competed in the league since their promotion in the 2008–09 season. St Johnstone also competed in the League Cup and the Scottish Cup.

Summary
St Johnstone finished sixth in the Scottish Premier League securing a place in the second qualifying round of the 2012–13 Europa League. They reached the fifth round of the Scottish Cup where they were beaten by eventual winners Hearts. They were beaten in the League Cup by fellow SPL side St Mirren in the third round.

Results

Pre-season

Scottish Premier League

Scottish Cup

Scottish League Cup

Player statistics

Squad information
Last updated 14 May 2012

|}

Disciplinary record
Includes all competitive matches.
Last updated 14 May 2012

Team statistics

League table

Transfers
St Johnstone's first significant move in the close season was to release nine first-team players, most of whom were forwards. David Robertson became their first signing during the close season, being brought in from Dundee United. He was followed by Sean Higgins from Dundee and Callum Davidson from Preston North End, all arriving on free transfers. The departures continued, however, with the news that Danny Grainger had joined Hearts and Michael Duberry was leaving to return to England.

Players in

Players out

Management
[St Johnstone started the season under Derek McInnes and after eleven games on 19 October McInnes was appointed manager of Bristol City and left St Johnstone along with assistant Tony Docherty. On 3 November 2011 Steve Lomas was appointed as manager.

References

External links
St Johnstone's fixtures at the club's official website
BBC Sport's St Johnstone page

St Johnstone F.C. seasons
St Johnstone